William Gerald Strongman (born November 14, 1936) is a Canadian former politician. He served in the Legislative Assembly of British Columbia from 1976 to 1979, as a Social Credit member for the constituency of Vancouver South.

References

1936 births
British Columbia Social Credit Party MLAs
Living people
Politicians from Toronto